Scottish Hydro plc was a public electricity supplier formed on 1 August 1989 after a change of name from North of Scotland Electricity plc on that date. It was listed on the London Stock Exchange and was once a constituent of the FTSE 100 Index but merged with Southern Electric in 1998.

History
The company was formed on 1 April 1989 to acquire the assets of the North of Scotland Hydro-Electric Board ahead of electricity privatisation in the United Kingdom under the name North of Scotland Electricity plc. The company was floated on the London Stock Exchange in June 1991. It merged with the English public electricity supplier Southern Electric plc to become Scottish and Southern Energy plc (SSE) on 14 December 1998.

Operations
The Scottish Hydro name was used as a brand name by SSE plc for supplying gas and electricity in Scotland, and by Scottish Hydro-Electric Power Distribution Ltd, the distribution network operator in the north of Scotland. In 2011, power consumption of the north was largely handled by Scottish Hydro.

Successors 

The Scottish Hydro brand continued in use for a time after the 1998 merger but SSE later used its own brand throughout the UK. Since the purchase of SSE's retail business by OVO Energy in 2020, the Scottish Hydro brand is a trading name of OVO Electricity Limited.

Fuel sources
The fuel sources of SSE Energy Supply Limited during the period from 1 April 2015 to 31 March 2016:

References

External links
Official website archived in February 1998

Scottish brands
Defunct companies of Scotland
Defunct electric power companies of the United Kingdom
Electric power companies of Scotland
Companies based in Perth, Scotland
Companies established in 1989
Companies formerly listed on the London Stock Exchange
SSE plc
1989 establishments in Scotland